The Atlanta Thrashers were an ice hockey team based in Atlanta, Georgia, United States. They were members of the Southeast Division of the Eastern Conference in the National Hockey League (NHL). The Thrashers joined the NHL in 1999 as an expansion franchise, and over 200 players have worn a Thrashers uniform since that time. The Thrashers won the Southeast Division and reached the playoffs for the first time in team history in 2006–07.

Ilya Kovalchuk is the franchise leader in goals scored (328), assists (287), points (615) and games (594).  Early in 2009, Kovalchuk was named the seventh captain in franchise history.  Kari Lehtonen leads the franchise in most goaltending categories, including games played (204), wins (94) and shutouts (14). At the end of the 2010–11 season the team was purchased by True North Sports & Entertainment and moved to Winnipeg, Manitoba, Canada for the start of the 2011–12 season and became the Winnipeg Jets.



Key
  Current NHL player.
  Hockey Hall of Famer

The "Seasons" column lists the first year of the season of the player's first game and the last year of the season of the player's last game. For example, a player who played one game in the 2000–2001 season would be listed as playing with the team from 2000–2001, regardless of what calendar year the game occurred within.

Skaters

Goaltenders

See also
List of Atlanta Flames players
List of Winnipeg Jets players

Notes
a: As of the 2005–2006 NHL season, all games have a winner; teams losing in overtime and shootouts are awarded one point thus the OTL stat replacees the tie statistic. The OTL column also includes SOL (Shootout losses).

References
General

 
 
 
Goaltenders: 2007–08 Atlanta Thrashers Media Guide, pg. 256
Skaters: 2007–08 Atlanta Thrashers Media Guide, pgs. 250–255

Specific

 
Atlanta
players